Cromwell Property Group is a commercial real estate investment and management company with operations in Australia, New Zealand and Europe. The Group is in the ASX 200 list. At December 2020, Cromwell had a market capitalisation of $A2.3 billion, a direct property investment portfolio in Australia valued at $A3 billion and total assets under management of $A11.6 billion across Australia, New Zealand and Europe. 

Cromwell employees 440 staff in 28 offices in 14 countries. Assets Under Management are spread across sectors including Office (66.2%), Retail (14.3%), Industrial/Logistics (13.4%), Property Securities (3.3%) and Other (2.8%). The portfolio comprises 220+ assets let to more than 2,850 tenants.

History 
The company began as a property syndicator, Westholme Ltd, renaming to Cromwell Corporation Ltd in 1998. By 2003 it had purchased 14 properties with a value of more than $A300 million in five Australian states and had $58 million of that in Cromwell Diversified Property Trust(CDPT). In 2004 it purchased 11 properties for $152 million, including 700 Collins Street, Melbourne for $A133 million, as a cornerstone investment in the CDPT. CDPT is merged with five smaller unlisted property trusts and stapled to Cromwell Corporation Limited creating Cromwell Property Group. In 2010 Cromwell raised $75.4 million via a placement and rights issue and acquired the Qantas Global Headquarters in Mascot, NSW for $143 million. In 2013 is had expanded enough to enter the ASX 300 Index. 
In 2015 it moved into Europe by acquiring Valad Europe, a pan-European commercial real estate platform for $208 million. 
In 2017 it launched Cromwell European REIT on main board of Singapore Stock Exchange.

Controversies 
In September 2020 a federal Liberal senator called for Foreign Investment Review Board (FIRB) regulators to step in and block a Singapore takeover offer for the Cromwell Property Group, arguing the bid contravened new rules brought in to safeguard Australian assets during the coronavirus pandemic. 
Cromwell co-founder and CEO Paul Weightman retired after 22 years following a boardroom battle over a failed proportional takeover bid by Singapore's ARA Asset Management.
There has been significant turmoil in the leadership of the company, with a new chair appointed in March 2021.  

In February 2021 Cromwell was forced to downgrade its distribution guidance for the year and put on hold a plan to launch a $1 billion Europe-based data centre fund. The COVID 19 pandemic and boardroom disruption were blamed.

References

External links 

 

Companies based in Queensland
Companies based in Brisbane
Companies listed on the Australian Securities Exchange
Australian brands
Australian companies established in 1998